Andrew Joseph Majda (30 January 1949 – 12 March 2021) was an American mathematician and the Morse Professor of Arts and Sciences at the Courant Institute of Mathematical Sciences of New York University. He was known for his theoretical contributions to partial differential equations as well as his applied contributions to diverse areas including shock waves, combustion, incompressible flow, vortex dynamics, and atmospheric sciences. Majda was listed as an ISI highly cited researcher in mathematics.

Career
Born in East Chicago, Indiana, Majda received a B.S. degree in mathematics from Purdue University in 1970. He then received M.S. and Ph.D. degrees in mathematics from Stanford University in 1971 and 1973, respectively. His Ph.D. thesis advisor was Ralph S. Phillips. He began his scientific career as an instructor at the Courant Institute of Mathematical Sciences from 1973 to 1975. Prior to returning to the Courant Institute in 1994, he held professorships at Princeton University during 1984–1994, the University of California, Berkeley during 1978–1984, and the University of California, Los Angeles during 1976–1978. At Courant Institute, Majda has been instrumental in setting up the "Center for Atmosphere-Ocean Science" which aims to promote cross-disciplinary research with modern applied mathematics in climate modelling and prediction.

Honors and awards
The Leroy P. Steele Prize for Seminal Contribution to Research - 2016 
Lagrange Prize of ICIAM - 2015 
Norbert Wiener Prize in Applied Mathematics - 2013
Honorary Doctorate of Science and Honorary Professor, Fudan University, Shanghai, China - 2008
Medal of the College de France - 2007
The New York City Mayor's Award for Excellence in Mathematical, Physical, and Engineering Sciences - 2004
Honorary Doctorate of Science, Purdue University - 2000
Gibbs Lecturer of the American Mathematical Society - 1995
National Academy of Sciences Prize in Applied Mathematics and Numerical Analysis - 1992
John von Neumann Lecture Prize of SIAM - 1990
Medal of the College de France - 1982

Majda was a member of National Academy of Sciences, American Mathematical Society, American Physical Society, and Society for Industrial and Applied Mathematics. In 2012 he became a fellow of the American Mathematical Society.

Books
Information theory and stochastics for multiscale nonlinear systems with Rafail V. Abramov, Marcus J. Grote, American Mathematical Society, 2005.
Vorticity and Incompressible Flow with Andrea L. Bertozzi, Cambridge University Press, 2008.
Nonlinear Dynamics and Statistical Theories for Basic Geophysical Flows with Xiaoming Wang, Cambridge University Press, 2009.
Filtering Complex Turbulent Systems with John Harlim, Cambridge University Press, 2012.
Introduction to Turbulent Dynamical Systems in Complex Systems, Springer, 2016.

References

External links

Purdue University alumni
Stanford University alumni
University of California, Los Angeles faculty
University of California, Berkeley College of Letters and Science faculty
Princeton University faculty
Courant Institute of Mathematical Sciences faculty
Fluid dynamicists
PDE theorists
20th-century American mathematicians
21st-century American mathematicians
1949 births
2021 deaths
Members of the United States National Academy of Sciences
Fellows of the Society for Industrial and Applied Mathematics
Fellows of the American Mathematical Society
Mathematicians from Indiana
People from East Chicago, Indiana